is a Horror-themed Japanese manga series written by  and illustrated by Aki Shimizu.

It is twelve volumes long and was serialized in Gentosha Comics' Comic Birz magazine, and licensed by Tokyopop in the West. The manga is rated M (Mature, Age 18+), due to its scenes of intense violence and nudity.

Plot
The story follows main protagonist Yusuke Himukai, on his quest to rescue his beloved Kikuri from the vampire Migiri. With the help of Migiri's loyal servant Kuraha, Migiri has been brought back to life and has taken Kikuri as his new bride. Yusuke races to save her, and he fights Migiri, costing him his hand in the process. Two years later Yusuke is found in a mental institution.

Reception
In Jason Thompson's online appendix to Manga: The Complete Guide, he describes the manga as "super-gory horror drama", but notes that the plot is a "gripping, complicated story which unpeels effortlessly". He notes that the manga artist here is departing from her usual style, but that the manga's style suits the story being told.

See also
Yato-no-kami

References

External links
 
 Blood Sucker at Madman Entertainment

2000 manga
Seinen manga
Tokyopop titles
Vampires in anime and manga
Gentosha manga